Abdul Gani is an Independent politician and the former Member of the Bangladesh Parliament of Cox's Bazar-4.

Career
Gani was elected to parliament from Cox's Bazar-4 as an Independent candidate in 1988.

References

Independent politicians in Bangladesh
Living people
4th Jatiya Sangsad members
Year of birth missing (living people)